Utricularia pobeguinii is a small annual carnivorous plant that belongs to the genus Utricularia. It is endemic to Africa and is only found in the region around Kindia, Guinea. It was originally described by François Pellegrin in 1914, reduced to a variety of U. spiralis by Peter Taylor in 1963, and later elevated back to the species level by Taylor upon further investigation.

See also 
 List of Utricularia species

References 

Carnivorous plants of Africa
Flora of Guinea
pobeguinii
Taxa named by François Pellegrin